Pootie Tang is a 2001 American comedy film written and directed by Louis C.K. Adapted from a comedy sketch that first appeared on The Chris Rock Show, the character Pootie Tang is a satire of the stereotyped action heroes who appeared in old blaxploitation films. The title character's speech, which vaguely resembles pidgin, is mostly unintelligible to the audience, but the other characters in the film have no problem understanding him. It has acquired a cult following.

Plot
Towards the beginning of the movie, Pootie Tang sits down for a TV interview, at which the interviewer asks about Pootie's upcoming movie. At this point, a movie clip is played. Although initially unclear, the events described below all appear to be part of the movie clip played during the interview as revealed at the end of the movie.

Pootie Tang, born in "a small town outside Gary, Indiana", is portrayed as a ladies' man who is "too cool for words", even as a young child. His life is marked by the deaths of his mother "Momma Dee", and shortly thereafter his father "Daddy Tang", who dies after being mauled by a gorilla during his shift at the steel mill (the third time that year someone had suffered that particular fate). Just before Daddy Tang's death, Pootie inherits his father's belt and is told that (as long as he has right on his side) he can "whoop anyone's ass with just that belt." He uses his dying breath to warn his son to not let the ladies get between him and the belt.

As a young adult, Pootie Tang rises to fame and becomes well known for a variety of reasons. He sings in nightclubs, stars in public service announcements for children, produces top-of-the-charts music hits, and generally defeats wrongdoers with the power of his belt. Dick Lecter, the chief operating officer of multi-industrial conglomerate LecterCorp, learns of Pootie Tang's positive influence on society — and his negative influence on LecterCorp's bottom line. After his henchmen and a villain named Dirty Dee are sent away by Pootie's friends, Lecter encourages his right-hand lady, Ireenie, to seduce Pootie Tang into signing an agreement with LecterCorp that would stop Pootie Tang's influence on America's children.

Pootie Tang falls for Ireenie's tricks and subsequently falls apart. His status as pop culture icon is destroyed, and he engages on a quest to "find [him]self". This journey is encouraged by his friend Biggie Shorty, who promises to wait for Pootie to return to her and to the rest of society. Pootie moves to a farm where the local sheriff decides Pootie should start dating his daughter. After his single corn stalk dies, he has a vision of Daddy Tang and Momma Dee. Daddy Tang reveals that there is nothing special about Pootie's belt; instead, Pootie must fight evil with the goodness that is inside him. After dealing with Dirty Dee and his henchman Froggy (as well as getting his belt back), Pootie realizes he must move back to the city and fight crime once again.

Pootie Tang returns to the city just as Dick Lecter is unveiling the first of his new restaurant chain, Pootie's Bad Time Burgers. At a small news conference, Pootie confronts Lecter only to discover that Lecter has amassed dozens of "Pootie-alikes" who will spread the message of LecterCorp around the nation. Pootie Tang, with the help of Biggie Shorty, defeats all of these henchmen and Lecter himself. Good triumphs over evil once again, and Biggie Shorty finally gets her man: she and Pootie Tang plan to get married now that Pootie is back. Elsewhere, Dick Lecter leaves corporate life and becomes an actor, Ireenie leaves him and becomes a counselor helping at-risk teenage prostitutes, and Dirty Dee is still dirty.

Cast
 Lance Crouther as Pootie Tang
 Cole Hawkins as “Little Pooty”
 J. B. Smoove as Trucky
 Bryan Hearne as “Little Trucky”
 Jennifer Coolidge as Ireenie
 Wanda Sykes as Biggie Shorty
 Robert Vaughn as Dick Lecter
 Chris Rock as J.B. / Radio DJ / Daddy Tang
 Mario Joyner as Lacey
 Reg E. Cathey as Dirty Dee
 J. D. Williams as Froggy
 Dave Attell as Frank
 Cathy Trien as Stacy
 Christopher Wynkoop as the Sheriff, Stacy’s father
 Laura Kightlinger as Laura Knight, a TV news anchorwoman
 Rick Shapiro as Shakey
 Missy Elliott as Diva
 David Cross as Dennis, a “Pootie-Alike” employed by Lecter
 Andy Richter as Record Executive
 Kristen Bell as Record executive's Daughter
 Jon Glaser as Recording Engineer
 Keesha Sharp as Party Girl
 Todd Barry as Greasy
 Bob Costas as himself

Production
Originally a Paramount Classics film titled Pootie Tang in Sine Your Pitty on the Runny Kine, the budget was increased and transferred to the main Paramount Pictures division. Louis C.K. has stated that he was all but fired from the film during the editing phase. According to him, Ali LeRoi was hired to extensively re-edit the film. Openly agreeing with Roger Ebert's dismissive criticism that the movie should not have even been released, C.K. has said that the finished product, though containing parts he enjoyed, was far from his own vision.

Reception
Critical reception was generally negative. On Rotten Tomatoes, the film has an approval rating of 27% based on 45 reviews, with an average score of 3.7/10. The site's critical consensus states: "Based as it is on a short skit, Pootie Tang overstays its welcome." On Metacritic, the film received a score of 31 based on 19 reviews, indicating "generally unfavorable reviews".

Roger Ebert gave the film a half-star rating, criticizing it for its excessive use of vulgar language and demeaning portrayal of women, describing it as a "train wreck" and finishing his review by bluntly stating "This film is not in a releasable condition." Nathan Rabin at The A.V. Club said Pootie Tang "borders on audience abuse" and "confuse[s] idiocy for absurdity and randomness for wit." In 2009, fellow A.V. Club writer Scott Tobias revisited the film and included it in his New Cult Canon series, noting that "Pootie Tang repelled mainstream critics and audiences, but it holds an exalted status among alt-comedians and fans of subversive anti-comedy in general."

Kevin Murphy also praised the film in his book A Year at the Movies:

Soundtrack

A soundtrack containing mainstream hip hop, dance, and R&B music was released on June 16, 2001, by Hollywood Records. It peaked at #51 on the Top R&B/Hip-Hop Albums and #22 on the Top Soundtracks.

In popular culture
 In Snoop Dogg’s song “Bo$$ Playa” from his 2002 album Paid tha Cost to Be da Boss, the chorus includes the line “Okay, ‘Sa Da Tay’ like my nigga Pootie Tang”.
 In Season 2, Episode 3 of the television series The Bernie Mac Show (“Pink Gold”), Chris Rock (who appears in Pootie Tang) attends a poker game at Bernie Mac's house. A player remarks that he loves Pootie Tang, to which Rock replies, "My mother didn't see that one."
 In the 2003 horror film spoof Scary Movie 3, George Carlin's character, The Architect, says he accidentally returned a cursed video tape to Blockbuster, thinking it was Pootie Tang. Subsequently, aliens arrive on Earth and claim they watched the video tape that spurred their visits to Earth because they thought it was Pootie Tang.
 In Kanye West's song "School Spirit" from his 2004 album The College Dropout, West references the movie when he raps, "See, that's how dude became the young Pootie Tang — tippy tow".
 In Megan Thee Stallion’s song “Freak Nasty” from her 2018 EP Tina Snow, she references the movie when she raps, "call that pussy Pootie Tang, 'cus I got the runny kine".  “Runny Kine" are the last two words in the title of Pootie's upcoming (fictional) movie, for which he is being interviewed during the first scene of the film.

References

External links

 
 
 
 

2001 films
2001 action comedy films
American action comedy films
American independent films
American satirical films
2000s English-language films
Films directed by Louis C.K.
Films with screenplays by Louis C.K.
Blaxploitation films
Films shot in New Jersey
Films shot in New York (state)
Hood comedy films
MTV Films films
Paramount Pictures films
Films produced by Chris Rock
3 Arts Entertainment films
2001 independent films
2000s satirical films
Films produced by Ali LeRoi
2000s American films